Sir Nicholas John Wald FRS, FRCP, FMedSci, qualified in medicine from University College London in 1967. He is currently honorary professor of preventive medicine, University College London, honorary professor, Population Health Research Institute, St George's, University of London, visiting professor, University of Oxford, and honorary consultant and adjunct professor, Brown University, Rhode Island. He was professor of environmental and preventive medicine from 1983 to 2019 at Barts and The London School of Medicine and Dentistry. He was co-founder and director of the Wolfson Institute of Preventive Medicine.

In the 1970s, Wald showed that fetal neural tube defects could be detected by measuring alpha-fetoprotein in the pregnant woman's blood. He was the innovator of the “MoM”, or multiple of the median, a measure of the level of screening markers.  He, with colleagues, first described the Triple test (1988), Combined test (1998), Quad test (2003), Integrated test (1999) and Reflex DNA test (2015).

In 1986 Wald showed that environmental tobacco smoke was a cause of lung cancer and was a member of the US National Academy of Sciences Committee - the first public body that reached this conclusion. In 2003 with Professor Malcolm Law, he showed that environmental tobacco smoke also caused cardiovascular disease.

In 1991 Wald showed that folic acid supplementation prevented most cases of neural tube defects. 
In 1999, together with Law, he invented the polypill.

He received, in 2000, the Joseph P. Kennedy Jr. Foundation Award, was elected a Fellow of the Royal Society (FRS) in 2004, and knighted in the 2008 Birthday Honours for services to preventive medicine. In 2019 he was elected a member of the US National Academy of Medicine.

References

1944 births
Living people
British medical researchers
British public health doctors
Fellows of the Royal Society
Knights Bachelor
Academics of Barts and The London School of Medicine and Dentistry
Medical doctors from London
Fellows of the Royal College of Physicians
Fellows of the Royal College of Obstetricians and Gynaecologists
Fellows of the Academy of Medical Sciences (United Kingdom)
Members of the National Academy of Medicine